Time 100 (often stylized as TIME 100) is an annual listicle of the 100 most influential people in the world, assembled by the American news magazine Time. First published in 1999 as the result of a debate among American academics, politicians, and journalists, the list is now a highly publicized annual event. Appearing on the list is often seen as an honor, and Time makes it clear that entrants are recognized for changing the world, regardless of the consequences of their actions. The final list of influential individuals is exclusively chosen by Time editors, with nominations coming from the Time 100 alumni and the magazine's international writing staff. Only the winner of the Reader's Poll, conducted days before the official list is revealed, is chosen by the general public. The corresponding commemorative gala is held annually in Manhattan.

In 2019, Time began publishing the Time 100 Next list, which "spotlights 100 rising stars who are shaping the future of business, entertainment, sports, politics, science, health and more."

Selection criteria
In 2004, Time editors identified "three rather distinct qualities" when choosing people to be listed. Time editor-at-large Michael Elliott wrote:
First, there were those who came to their status by means of a very public possession of power; President George W. Bush is the pre-eminent example. Others, though rarely heard from in public, nonetheless have a real influence on the great events of our time. Think of Ali Husaini Sistani, the Grand Ayatullah of Iraq's Shi'ites. Still others affect our lives through their moral example. Consider Nelson Mandela's forgiveness of his captors and his willingness to walk away from the South African presidency after a single term.

For the 2007 list, managing editor Richard Stengel clarified that the Time 100 focused on the most influential people rather than the hottest, most popular, or most powerful people. He said:
Influence is hard to measure, and what we look for is people whose ideas, whose example, whose talent, whose discoveries transform the world we live in. Influence is less about the hard power of force than the soft power of ideas and example. Yes, there are Presidents and dictators who can change the world through fiat, but we're more interested in innovators like Monty Jones, the Sierra Leone scientist who has developed a strain of rice that can save African agriculture. Or heroes like the great chess master Garry Kasparov, who is leading the lonely fight for greater democracy in Russia. Or Academy Award-winning actor George Clooney who has leveraged his celebrity to bring attention to the tragedy in Darfur.

History

2000s 
From 2005 to 2008, Time magazine awarded one of Darko Mladenovic's Ray crystal sculptures to each Time 100 honoree. These sculptures were produced by Swarovski.

In 2009, the winner of the online poll was 4chan founder Christopher Poole, who received 16,794,368 votes. Time claimed that their technical team "did detect and extinguish several attempts to hack the vote". However, it was shown weeks before the poll ended that the results had been heavily influenced by hackers. The first letters of the top 21 names spell out "marblecake also the game". Marblecake was an obscene 4chan meme, and #marblecake was the name of the Internet Relay Chat channel used for communication by some of the participants in rigging the poll.

2010s 
In its online presentation, Time introduced the 2010 list as follows: "In our annual Time 100 issue, we name the people who most affect our world". The overall list was organized with four main sub-lists: Leaders, Heroes, Artists, and Thinkers. Oprah Winfrey continued a streak that began in 2004, having been included on every Time 100 list, and was one of 31 women on the list. While 2012 saw a break in Oprah's streak, she would be a finalist four more times during the decade and returned to the list in 2018.The 2010 list included many expected names and some surprises such as Scott Brown, who HuffPost described as a premature selection at that point in his career.

The 2010 list included 10 Indians, but according to a local news station in India, Time faced criticism when they excluded Bollywood actor Shah Rukh Khan from the list, even though he was supposedly "in the race". According to Rob Cain of Forbes, "Khan is the biggest and most revered figure [in India]", and Khan's fan following is one of the largest in Bollywood.

The announcement of the list was celebrated by a black tie gala at the Time Warner Center in New York City on May 4, 2010. Time readers contributed to the selection through an online vote of over 200 finalists.

Time introduced the 2011 list as follows: "Meet the most influential people in the world. They are artists and activists, reformers and researchers, heads of state, and captains of industry. Their ideas spark dialogue and dissent and sometimes even revolution. Welcome to this year's Time 100." The announcement was celebrated with a black tie event in New York City on April 26, 2011. The honorees were joined by A-list celebrities at the Jazz at Lincoln Center for the event. Time readers contributed to the selection through an online vote of over 200 finalists.

The list included familiar leaders including U.S. President Barack Obama and Chancellor of Germany Angela Merkel, as well as "newcomers" to the global press. The list included numerous figures representing the Arab Spring in the Middle East, including rebels, political leaders, and news correspondents. Media figures unrelated to the Arab Spring were also listed. Additionally, Prince William and Kate Middleton were part of the list during the week before their wedding. The list also included Katsunobu Sakurai, the mayor of Minamisōma, Fukushima, which was the city most affected by the 2011 Tōhoku earthquake and tsunami.

Revealed on April 24, 2014, the 2014 list featured Beyoncé on the U.S. cover and Robert Redford, Jason Collins, and Mary Barra on international covers. The list included 41 women, the most in the list's history. The gala was held on April 29, 2014, in New York City.

Time managing editor Nancy Gibbs commented:

At age 14, Spanish-British born actress Millie Bobby Brown became the youngest person to be listed on the 2018 list, when Stranger Things was in its third season.

In the 2019 list, Time chose authors to write the honorees' blurbs. Some of the pairings include Gal Gadot writing about Dwayne Johnson, Shawn Mendes writing about Taylor Swift, Shonda Rhimes writing about Sandra Oh, Ava DuVernay writing about Gayle King, and Beyoncé writing about Michelle Obama.

2020s
The 2020 list included Bollywood Actor Ayushmann Khurrana, rapper Megan Thee Stallion, comedian Phoebe Waller-Bridge, tennis champion Naomi Osaka (her second time being included), Formula 1 driver Lewis Hamilton, attorney Nury Turkel, American football player Patrick Mahomes, and environmental justice advocate Cecilia Martinez.

On September 15, Time revealed the 2021 list, distributed into the categories Icons, Pioneers, Titans, Artists, Leaders and Innovators. Each category has a highlighted section of personalities being featured on the Time magazine cover, naming Prince Harry and Meghan Markle as Icons, Billie Eilish as Pioneer, Simone Biles as Titan, Kate Winslet as Artist, Ngozi Okonjo-Iweala as Leader and Jensen Huang as Innovator. Furthermore, Time held a readers poll prior to the reveal of the editors list, asking whether certain personalities should be included in this year's annual list. Nearly 1.8 million votes were cast, with Britney Spears claiming the top spot, while also being featured as an Icon.

Editor-in-chief Edward Felsenthal commented on the current working circumstances at Time and the effects of the ongoing COVID-19 pandemic on their annual gala:

Multiple appearances
Each category is given equal weight every year, but some people are more likely to make repeat appearances over time.

The following list includes individuals who have appeared at least three times. The order is based on the number of times each person has been listed in Time 100. Those who are tied are listed alphabetically. Some individuals, such as Nelson Mandela, have also been listed in the one-off Time's list of "The Most Important People of the 20th Century". They are listed in bold.

Listed five times or more

Listed four times

Listed three times

Controversies

Controversies over exclusions 
The exclusion of then-British Prime Minister Tony Blair from the 2004 list caused mild controversy. Time editor-at-large Michael J. Elliott defended the decision to consistently exclude Blair, saying that "Gerhard Schröder and Jacques Chirac are not there either. This is a worldwide list. There are no Western European political leaders on it because they are not that powerful or influential at this time." Although George W. Bush has been on the list several times, controversy emerged when he was dropped from the list in 2007 in part because of the Democratic victory in the 2006 congressional election. Former Senator Rick Santorum (R–PA) said on Fox News:The fact of the matter is, the president of the United States, I don't care who's in that office, is the most powerful man on the face of the Earth and has more influence over various aspects of lives, not just in this country, but around the world. And for Time magazine to dismiss that just shows you how biased and, I would argue, hateful they are.

Adi Ignatius, Times deputy managing editor who oversaw the list at the time, explained that "any U.S. president has a certain built-in influence ... Bush had actually squandered some of that built-in influence. His position on Iraq has cost him support in his own party. ... To a certain point, he sort of reached a lame-duck status".

Controversies over inclusions 
The list has also generated controversy over inclusions. In 2005, conservative commentator Ann Coulter was listed, which led Salon to observe:
When Time magazine named Ann Coulter among its 100 "most influential people" last week, alongside such heavyweights as Ariel Sharon, Bill Clinton, Nelson Mandela, Kim Jong-il, and the Dalai Lama, the choice produced guffaws online. Plugging the issue on Fox News last week, Time executive editor Priscilla Painton insisted it was Coulter's use of "humor" that made her so influential, stopping just short of suggesting that Coulter is the conservative Jon Stewart. But even Fox's Bill O'Reilly wasn't buying it. He pressed Painton: "Do you think people, Americans, listen to Ann Coulter? Do you think she has influence in public opinion?"

Time defended Coulter as a best-selling author whose controversial commentary strongly affected political debates in the United States. Coulter did not, however, make additional appearances on the list.

Mistakes 
In February 2016, Time included the male British author Evelyn Waugh on its "100 Most Read Female Writers in College Classes" list, generating media attention and concerns regarding fact-checking at the magazine. Time later issued a retraction. In a BBC interview with Justin Webb, Oxford professor Valentine Cunningham said the mistake was "a piece of profound ignorance on the part of Time magazine".

Other Time lists

Next Generation Leaders
Since 2014, in partnership with Rolex, Time has published a class of young pioneers "in politics, business, culture, science and sports" who are reshaping the world around them. It is, per the magazine's editor-in-chief Edward Felsenthal, "an opportunity to elevate" the trailblazers "who are building a better future". Included in the 2022 list was Lina Abu Akleh, a human rights advocate who is the niece of Shireen Abu Akleh - a journalist likely killed by Israeli soldiers.

The 25 Most Influential People on the Internet 
Since 2015, Time has also published a list titled "The 25 Most Influential People on the Internet", which features people whose influence and dominance may have changed Internet culture; who have support, position, and prominence in various sections of social media; or who use and/or rely on the Internet as a platform for change. People who have been listed range from political figures, such as Donald Trump and Alexandria Ocasio-Cortez, to teenage YouTubers, such as JoJo Siwa and Emma Chamberlain. 

Others who have been listed include Lil Nas X, whose debut hit broke the record for most weeks spent atop the Billboard Hot 100 after being created and distributed on the Internet, and actress and presenter Jameela Jamil, who is known widely beyond her profession for her online activism.

Time 100 Next list 
In 2019, Time began publishing the Time 100 Next list, which "spotlights 100 rising stars who are shaping the future of business, entertainment, sports, politics, science, health and more." It is considered an expansion of the current Time 100 list. Although the list has no explicit age cap, it is more focused on up-and-coming figures and "rising stars". The Next list features profiles written by established Time 100 alumni.

Time 100 Women of the Year 
In 2019, Time created 89 new covers to celebrate women of the year starting from 1920.

See also 
 Time Person of the Year
 Time 100: The Most Important People of the Century

References 

Top people lists